Anacolosa frutescens, also known as galo or galonut, is a plant in the family Olacaceae. The specific epithet  is from the Latin frutex meaning "shrub". It produces edible fruits and nuts eaten in the Philippines.

Description
The greenish grey bark is smooth to mottled. The wood is sometimes locally used for house posts.

Distribution and habitat
Anacolosa frutescens is native to Southeast Asia, from the Andaman and Nicobar Islands and Myanmar through Malaysia, Indonesia, and the Philippines. Its habitat is mixed dipterocarp forests, sometimes heath and peat swamp forests, occasionally submontane forests, from sea-level to  altitude.

Uses
The fruit and seeds of galo (also known as aluloy) is eaten in the Philippines. The fruit is usually boiled before consumption and has a taste similar to avocado. The seeds have a flavor described as being similar to a mixture of sweet corn and chestnuts.

References

Olacaceae
Flora of Myanmar
Flora of the Andaman Islands
Flora of the Nicobar Islands
Flora of Thailand
Flora of Malesia
Plants described in 1826